For the Love of George is a 2018 comedy film produced by Nadia Jordan, directed by Maria Burton and written by Nadia Jordan and Hayley Nolan. Jordan also stars in the film alongside Rosanna Arquette, Tate Donovan, Rex Lee, Shaun Sipos and Kristen Johnston. The film tells the story of Poppy, a jilted wife who leaves her cheating husband in England and sets off to Los Angeles hoping to meet who she believes is the perfect man, George Clooney.

The film showed at the 2017 Chicago Comedy Film Festival, La Femme International Film Festival 2017, the 2017 Orlando Film Festival and the Saint Paul Frozen Film Festival 2018.

Plot 
The story begins in early 2014. Poppy Wakefield lives a charmed existence, playing domestic goddess for her husband Stephen and working as a freelance magazine journalist from her beautiful home in England. Her seemingly perfect, if predictable, life is shattered when she discovers that Stephen’s recent birdwatching hobby is a cover for an affair.

Still in shock from betrayal, she finds some much needed respite in an entertainment talk show segment highlighting George Clooney's charitable work. To Poppy, George is everything her husband isn't; suave, sophisticated, funny and charming, someone who really cares about making a difference in the world and the ideal match for her.

When she receives a well timed invitation to visit her close friend Justin in Los Angeles she decides to give fate a helping hand and flies to LA on a quest to cross paths with George until a surprise announcement brings Poppy and her romantic fantasy crashing back down to earth.

Cast 
 Nadia Jordan as Poppy
 Rex Lee as Justin
 Rosanna Arquette as Dr Faye
 Tate Donovan as Alvin Kooney
  Kristen Johnston as Psychic Sara
 Shaun Sipos as Luke
 Marina Sirtis as Sharon
 Henry Hereford as Stephen
 Petra Bryant as Irina
 Adrienne Whitney as Marcy
 Ruth Connell as Stacy
 Paul Provenza as Donny
 Ben Gleib as Lawrence
 Tracy Ransome as Ashley
 Sandro Monetti as Mario
 Ron S. Geffner as Newscaster

Production 
The film is produced by Fluffy Cat Productions Inc. A strong advocate of supporting women in the entertainment industry, producer Nadia Jordan enlisted a predominantly female crew. A portion of the profits from the film will be donated to the Enough Project charity, Not On Our Watch's main partner.

Writing 
Inspired by George Clooney and his humanitarian work, Jordan had the idea for the movie after reading a book written by John Prendergast and Don Cheadle titled Not on Our Watch. The book details the history of Sudan and how the Darfur crisis evolved and urges readers to get involved and take action to raise awareness in various ways, including hosting a film screening. George, in his capacity as co-founder of Not On Our Watch (NOOW), channeled significant support to NOOW's main partner organization, Enough. At the time of concept George Clooney was considered one of the most eligible bachelors in the world. According to Jordan this is what prompted her to come up with the story for the film, which was originally titled Looking for George Clooney.

Soundtrack 
The For the Love of George soundtrack is set for release February 2018 and features artists Unsung Lilly, David Bertok, Lisa Brigantino, James Bowers, Dominique Pruitt and Alex-Louise.

Release 
For the Love of George is distributed by Vision Films.

Accolades 
For the Love of George was an Official Selection at the Chicago Comedy Film Festival 2017, La Femme International Film Festival 2017, the Orlando Film Festival 2017 and the Saint Paul Frozen Film Festival 2018. At the Chicago Comedy Film Festival, the film won the Audience Choice Award and Top Female Filmmaker Award (Nadia Jordan) and received three nominations at the Orlando Film Festival - Best Actress (Nadia Jordan), Best Supporting Performance (Kristen Johnston) and Best Trailer. It recently won the Best Comedy Feature Award at the Saint Paul Frozen Film Festival

References

External links
 
 

2017 films
Films set in Los Angeles
American romantic comedy films
2010s English-language films
2010s American films